The bare-faced go-away-bird (Crinifer personatus) is a species of bird in the family Musophagidae which is native to the eastern Afrotropics. It is named for its distinctive and uniquely bare, black face.

Description
The sexes are similar, other than the female's green beak.

Habits

It is a noisy and restless species, that moves about singly or in groups. Its call is a double or repetitive kow-kow.

Range and habitat
It is found in two disjunct areas in Africa: one in Ethiopia, and the other in Burundi, DRC, Kenya, Malawi, Rwanda, Tanzania, Uganda and Zambia. It occurs in open woodland, thickets and in cultivation with scattered trees. It may be found at altitudes of up to 1,400 metres, but at Loita up to 2,200 metres in scattered cedar, acacia and evergreen scrub.

Races
Two geographically isolated races are accepted:
 C. p. personatus (Rüppell, 1842) – Ethiopian Rift Valley
Description: More extensive green breast plumage, underside of wings and tail greenish, face with minute brown plumes
 C. p. leopoldi (Shelley, 1881) – s Uganda, Rwanda, Burundi, sw Kenya, Tanzania, n Malawi, ne Zambia and se DRC.
Description: Face bare and black, less extensive green breast plumage

Food 
These birds primarily eat fruits, leaf buds, and seeds.

Reproduction 
Like other Turacos, the bare-faced go-away-bird lays two to three greenish-white eggs each mating season. Nests are often built in tall acacia trees.

References

External links

 Bare-faced go-away-bird, sound recordings, xeno-canto

bare-faced go-away-bird
Birds of East Africa
bare-faced go-away-bird
Taxonomy articles created by Polbot
Taxa named by Eduard Rüppell
Taxobox binomials not recognized by IUCN